Hiram Meikle (28 July 1897 – 25 June 1989) was a Jamaican cricketer. He played in one first-class match for the Jamaican cricket team in 1938/39.

See also
 List of Jamaican representative cricketers

References

External links
 

1897 births
1989 deaths
Jamaican cricketers
Jamaica cricketers
People from Saint Mary Parish, Jamaica